Londos is a surname. Notable people with the surname include:

Anastasios Londos (1791–1856), Greek politician and senator
Andreas Londos (1786–1846), Greek military leader and politician
Jim Londos (1894–1975), Greek-American professional wrestler

See also
Londo (disambiguation)